Presidential, legislative and local elections were held on November 9, 1965, in the Philippines. Incumbent President Diosdado Macapagal lost his opportunity to get a second full term as President of the Philippines to Senate President Ferdinand Marcos. His running mate, Senator Gerardo Roxas lost to former Vice President Fernando Lopez. Emmanuel Pelaez did not run for vice president. An unprecedented twelve candidates ran for president; however, nine of those were nuisance candidates.

Results

President

Vice-President

Senate

House of Representatives

See also
Commission on Elections
Politics of the Philippines
Philippine elections
6th Congress of the Philippines

References

External links
 Official website of the Commission on Elections

1965
1965 elections in the Philippines